Kingston Airport , also known as Norman Rogers Airport, is a regional airport located  west of the core of Kingston, Ontario, Canada.

The airport is named after former MP Norman McLeod Rogers (Kingston City 1935–1940), Minister of Labour and then National Defence in Prime Minister William Lyon Mackenzie King's cabinet. Rogers died in a plane crash on June 10, 1940 while flying from Ottawa to Toronto for a speaking engagement.

History

Before 1940, Kingston was served only by the Kingston Airfield, a grass strip just north of the city's downtown, which closed in 1942. In 1940, during the Second World War, an airfield was built to the west of Kingston to serve as a training station for the Royal Air Force's No. 31 Service Flying Training School (SFTS). The school provided advanced flight training in Battle and Harvard aircraft. In 1942 the school became part of the British Commonwealth Air Training Plan (BCATP). The BCATP's No. 14 Service Flying Training School moved to Kingston in 1944 and merged with the RAF school. No. 14 SFTS used Harvards, Yales and Ansons. The airport's runway outline displays the classic BCATP triangle pattern. A decommissioned yellow Harvard aircraft now stands on a pedestal near the airport entrance to commemorate the airport's wartime role.

In 1953, naval air squadron VC 921 was formed as a tender to HMCS Cataraqui, and used the airport. The unit operated Harvards and one C-45D Expeditor until it was disbanded in 1959.

The airport was transferred to city control in 1972.

The airport was originally built with six  runways; however, this was reduced to three, as they were all parallel runways. One can still see where some parts of the parallel runways were from the air. The remaining runway, 12/30, was decommissioned in 2003 and converted to a taxiway.

In 2018, the city began on extending the runway 01/19 from 5,000 ft to 6,001 ft. At the same time, the terminal was under construction with plans to expand the post security waiting area to accommodate larger aircraft such as a 737 or Q400. Construction is also underway at the departure and arrival areas to accommodate more passengers as well as a general renovation to make it more inviting and accessible.

Air Canada indefinitely suspended its operations at Kingston Airport in June 2020 because of the financial impact of the COVID-19 pandemic in Canada.

On August 31, 2020, FlyGTA Airlines announced that it would begin regular passenger service four days per week between Kingston and Billy Bishop Toronto City Airport on September 10. However, due to COVID, the airline stopped running this service on December 10, 2020.

On December 9, 2021, Pascan Aviation announced that it would begin regular passenger service between Kingston and Montréal–Trudeau International Airport starting March 14, 2022.

On January 11, 2022 the City of Kingston announced that once again, it has partnered with FlyGTA Airlines to offer passenger service between Kingston and Toronto starting January 31, 2022.

On December 1, 2022 the City of Kingston announced that Pascan Aviation will be pausing their air service at YGK Airport as of January 6, 2023. The pause in service means that Kingston will be losing its only regular passenger airline service, at least temporarily.

Airlines and destinations

Passenger

Cargo

Frequencies
Kingston Airport services two frequencies: ATIS (135.550 MHz) and radio (122.500 MHz). There is also guidance for private aircraft needing fuel or parking on Kingston Flying Club Advisory (122.800 MHz).

There is an instrument landing system servicing Runway 19, on the frequency 111.3 MHz. 
Kingston also has a non-directional beacon (NDB) that transmits "YGK" in Morse code on the longwave radio frequency of 263 kHz.

Operations

Kingston is a mandatory frequency airport with an operating flight service station. The airport also supports a large amount of general aviation traffic, including flight training and general recreational flying. As one of the only public airports to offer an ILS approach along the corridor between Montréal–Trudeau and Toronto–Pearson (along with Ottawa Macdonald–Cartier), the Kingston airport is an important alternate during poor weather conditions.

Kingston Flying Club, a flight school and charter operation, is located in hangar #5.
 
The airport is classified as an airport of entry by Nav Canada and is staffed by the Canada Border Services Agency. CBSA officers at this airport can handle aircraft with no more than 30 passengers.

See also
 RCAF Station Kingston

References

External links
 
 Page about this airport on COPA's Places to Fly airport directory 

Certified airports in Ontario
Airports of the British Commonwealth Air Training Plan
Transport in Kingston, Ontario
Buildings and structures in Kingston, Ontario